Peckham was a borough constituency in South London which returned one Member of Parliament (MP) to the House of Commons of the Parliament of the United Kingdom. Elections were held using the first-past-the-post voting system.

It was created for the 1885 general election and abolished for the 1997 general election, when it was replaced by the new constituency of Camberwell and Peckham.

History 
The constituency was, by the time of its abolition, a safe Labour seat. It was held for the last thirteen years of its existence by Harriet Harman, who went on to become the deputy leader of the Labour Party.

Boundaries 

1885–1918: The wards of North Peckham and South Peckham.
1918–1950: The Metropolitan Borough of Camberwell wards of Clifton, Goldsmith, Nunhead, Rye Lane, St Mary's, and The Rye.
1950–1974: The Metropolitan Borough of Camberwell wards of Addington, Clifton, Coburg, Goldsmith, Marlborough, North Peckham, St George's, St Giles, St Mary's, The West, and Town Hall.
1974–1983: The London Borough of Southwark wards of Brunswick, Burgess, Consort, Faraday, Friary, Newington, and St Giles.
1983–1997: The London Borough of Southwark wards of Barset, Brunswick, Consort, Faraday, Friary, Liddle, Newington, and St Giles.

Members of Parliament

Elections

Elections in the 1880s

Elections in the 1890s

Elections in the 1900s

Elections in the 1910s

Elections in the 1920s

Elections in the 1930s

Election in the 1940s

Elections in the 1950s

Elections in the 1960s

Elections in the 1970s

Elections in the 1980s

Elections in the 1990s

See also
 Southwark local elections
 List of parliamentary constituencies in London

References

Bibliography
 British Parliamentary Election Results 1885-1918, compiled and edited by F.W.S. Craig (Macmillan Press 1974)
 Debrett’s Illustrated Heraldic and Biographical House of Commons and the Judicial Bench 1886
 Debrett’s House of Commons and the Judicial Bench 1901
 Debrett’s House of Commons and the Judicial Bench 1918
 

Parliamentary constituencies in London (historic)
Constituencies of the Parliament of the United Kingdom established in 1885
Constituencies of the Parliament of the United Kingdom disestablished in 1997
Politics of the London Borough of Southwark
Constituency
Harriet Harman